The Rumour is the thirteenth studio album by Olivia Newton-John on 2 August 1988. The title track was written by Elton John and Bernie Taupin, features backing vocals and piano by John. The album featured the singles "The Rumour", "Can't We Talk It Over in Bed" (originally recorded by Grayson Hugh, whose version was released after Newton-John's) and the Australian-only promo-single "It's Always Australia for Me", which was released for the Australian Bicentenary in 1988. This was also her first album not produced by long-time producer, John Farrar.

Background 
The Rumour features the return of Olivia Newton-John after a two-year break due to the birth of her daughter Chloe Lattanzi in 1986. It has a careful production with the collaboration of some well-known songwriters, but it was a commercial failure. It marks a notable decline in Newton-John's popularity, being her lowest charting since If Not for You in 1971. It was her last studio album via Mercury.

This album was praised by critics as more mature, with Newton-John addressing topics such as AIDS ("Love and Let Live"), the environment and single-parent households.

Track listing

Notes
 denotes a co-producer

Personnel
Performers and musicians

 Olivia Newton-John – lead vocals, backing vocals (1, 2, 4, 7–10)
 Elton John – digital piano (1), backing vocals (1)
 James Newton Howard – additional keyboards (1), additional synthesizers (1), drum programming (1)
 John Philip Shenale – keyboards (2, 4–10), programming (2, 4, 5, 7–10)
 Bob Thiele Jr. – keyboards (2), programming (2)
 Charles Giordano – keyboards (3)
 John Sheard – keyboards (3)
 John Capek – keyboards (4), programming (4), synthesizer arrangements (4)
 Billy Meyers – string arrangements (4, 7), keyboards (7), programming (7)
 Randy Goodrum – keyboards (5, 8), programming (5, 6, 8), arrangements (5)
 Mark Heard – keyboards (7), programming (7), guitars (7)
 Leon Ware – keyboards (8), programming (8), backing vocals (8)
 David Ricketts – keyboards (9), programming (9)
 Davey Johnstone – guitars (1)
 Dann Huff – guitars (2)
 Jerry Friedman – guitars (3)
 Michael Landau – guitars (4–8)
 Jimmy Rip – guitars (4, 6, 10)
 Jef Scott – guitars (9, 10), backing vocals (10)
 David Baerweld – guitars (9), bass guitar (9)
 Neil Stubenhaus – bass guitar (1)
 Davey Faragher – bass guitar (2), backing vocals (2)
 Jason Scheff – bass guitar (7, 8), backing vocals (7)
 Abraham Laboriel – bass guitar (10)
 Carlos Vega – drum overdubs (1)
 Ed Greene – drums (2, 4–10)
 Lenny Castro – percussion (1)
 Paulinho da Costa – percussion (4, 5, 7–10)
 Kim Hutchcroft – baritone saxophone (1)
 Gary Herbig – tenor saxophone (1)
 Dan Higgins – tenor saxophone (1)
 Gerald Albright – saxophone (6)
 Lincoln Adler – saxophone (8)
 Lew McCreary – trombone (1)
 Bill Reichenbach Jr. – trombone (1)
 Gary Grant – trumpet (1)
 Jerry Hey – trumpet (1)
 Chuck Findley – trumpet (6, 10)
 Tommy Morgan – harmonica (6)
 Bruce Roberts – backing vocals (1)
 Janis Liebhart – backing vocals (2)
 Davitt Sigerson – backing vocals (2, 10)
 Amy Sky – backing vocals (4, 10)
 Tom Keane – backing vocals (7)
 Julia Waters Tillman – backing vocals (9)
 Luther Waters – backing vocals (9)
 Maxine Waters Willard – backing vocals (9)
 Oren Waters  – backing vocals (9)
 Ned Albright – backing vocals (10)
 Steven Soles – backing vocals (10)

Technical
 Producers – Elton John and James Newton Howard (track 1); Davitt Sigerson (tracks 2 and 4–10); Sandy Linzer and Hank Medress (track 3); Randy Goodrum (co-producer on tracks 5 and 9)
 Production coordination – Shari Sutcliffe (track 1) and Steve Rosen (track 3)
 Engineers – Jack Joseph Puig, Ross Pallone and Bob Schaper (track 1); John Beverly Jones (tracks 2 and 4–10); Bill Schenman (track 3)
 Assistant recording – Mike Klouster, Michael Mason and Martin Schmeizie (track 1); Ted Blaisdell, Jim Dineen, Ken Felton and Mitch Zelezry (tracks 2, 3, 4, 6, 7, 8 and 10); Randy Goodrum (tracks 5 and 9)
 Strings on tracks 4 and 8 recorded by Allen Sides
 Recorded at Kren Studio and The Grey Room (Hollywood, CA); Skyline Recording (Topanga, CA); Ocean Way Recording, Sunset Sound, Ground Control Studios, California Phase Studios and Studio 55 (Los Angeles, CA); Avatar (Malibu, CA); Right Track Recording and Skyline Studios (New York, New York)
 Mixing – Ross Pallone (track 1); Brian Malouf (tracks 2, 4 and 10); John Beverly Jones (tracks 5–9)
 Mixed at Studio 55 (Los Angeles, California)
 Mastered by Stephen Marcussen at Precision Mastering (Hollywood, California)
 Art direction and design – Jeff Adamoff and Michael Diehl
 Photography – Herb Ritts

Charts

Olivia Down Under video

Olivia Down Under is a compilation of music and clips from the album The Rumour released in 1989, featuring Newton-John performing songs from The Rumour against a backdrop of Australian scenery. For the special, Newton-John was nominated for a CableACE Award for Performance in a Music Special in 1989.

Contents
"Tutta La Vita"
"Click Go the Shears"
"Walk Through Fire"
"Old Fashioned Man"
"Let's Talk About Tomorrow"
"Winter Angel"
"Get Out"
"Big and Strong"
"Love and Let Live"
"Australia for Me"
"The Rumour"

References

1988 albums
Olivia Newton-John albums
Olivia Newton-John video albums
Music video compilation albums
1989 video albums
1989 compilation albums